Cyklonetka was a prototype of convertible three-wheeler cyclecar designed in 1939 by brothers Eugeniusz, Jan, Wacław Knawow, in their workshop in Kielce, Poland.

History 
Cyklonetka was designed by a team of brothers: Eugeniusz, Jan, and Wacław Knawow in their workshop in Kielce, Poland. All elements of the car, but the engine, were manufactured by brothers themselves in their workshop. The engine was manufactured in the Steinhagen-Stransky factory in Warsaw. In summer 1939, the brothers had traveled with their construction, equipped with the bike registration plate, to Warsaw, where they met with Antoni Roman, the minister of industry and trade, who was impressed with their construction, and commented that the vehicle should have car registration plate instead. Soon after that, Nazi Germany had invaded Poland, beginning the World War II, which made it impossible for the future development of the car.

Specifications 
The cyclecar was a convertible three-wheeler cyclecar with moped engine with a capacity of 98 cm³, which was manufactured in the Steinhagen-Stransky factory in Warsaw.

References 

1930s cars
Cars introduced in 1939
Concept cars
Cars of Poland
Cyclecars
Convertibles